Gloomhaven is a cooperative board game for one to four players designed by Isaac Childres and published by Cephalofair Games in 2017. It is a campaign-based dungeon crawl game including a narrative campaign, 95 unique playable scenarios, and 17 playable classes. Since its introduction the game has been acclaimed by reviewers, and has been described as one of the best board games ever made.

Gameplay 
Gloomhaven is a fantasy-themed, campaign-based tactical skirmish game, in which players try to triumph in combat-based scenarios which scale in difficulty depending on the number of players. The game is cooperative and campaign driven, with one to four players working their way through a branching story consisting of 95 scenarios. The campaign develops in a legacy format, with stickers that are placed on the board and cards and sealed envelopes that are opened when certain criteria are met.

While it has drawn comparisons to role-playing games such as Dungeons & Dragons and other dungeon crawl board games, Gloomhaven uses game mechanics similar to modern eurogames.

Characters and monsters move about on hex tiles representing dungeons and cellars. Players simultaneously choose two cards to play each turn, each of which has a top and a bottom half, and choose the top half of one card and the bottom of the other to allow their characters to take actions such as moving, healing and attacking monsters. Randomization is not provided by dice, as is usually the case with such games, but is handled by a deck of cards.

Release and reception 
The game was originally sold via a 2015 Kickstarter campaign which raised $386,104 from 4,904 backers. After strong early reviews, a second Kickstarter campaign was launched on April 4, 2017, and delivered in November 2017 which raised about $4 million from over 40,000 backers. The game was released shortly thereafter to retail for a suggested price of $140.

Gloomhaven has received critical acclaim, culminating in the game reaching the  spot as the top rated board game on leading website BoardGameGeek in 2017,  where it stayed until February 2023. It also won six Golden Geek awards from the site, including for the best overall game of 2017, best strategy game, best cooperative game, most innovative game, best solo game, and best thematic game. Gaming website Geek & Sundry described Gloomhaven as "a masterful design" and suggested "it belongs in a museum". Matt Thrower called it one of the best fantasy board games available, while noting that "Gloomhaven was the critical hit of the year." Ars Technica similarly praised the game's strategy, action system, gameplay and solitare mode. Games Radar awarded the game five stars and dubbed it as "the ultimate tabletop dungeon crawler", and Board Games Land has described the game as "truly a masterpiece". The game was also commercially successful, and sold approximately 120,000 copies as of August 2018.

Awards

Expansions and spin-offs 

Gloomhaven: Forgotten Circles, the game's first expansion,  was released in Q2 2019. It includes a new character class, the Aesther Diviner, 20 new scenarios that are primarily focused on that class, and new items and monsters. Its story is set after Gloomhaven's campaign.

Gloomhaven: Jaws of the Lion, a smaller, standalone version of the game, which was released in July 2020, initially as a Target exclusive. Designed to appeal to more casual gaming fans, the story in this version is set before the events of the original Gloomhaven, and has players investigate a series of disappearances in the city. The game features 25 new scenarios, five of which comprise a tutorial designed to ease new players into the game. Some, but not all, of the game components are compatible with the basic Gloomhaven game.

Sequel

In 2020, Frosthaven was launched as a standalone sequel sold initially via a Kickstarter campaign. The campaign raised almost $13 million, making it the highest ever funded campaign for a game on the platform, from over 83,000 backers. The game is set in a small northern outpost that mercenaries are struggling to protect. Childres changed several aspects of the game's story and setting to address cultural bias.

Frosthaven was scheduled to ship for Kickstarter backers in September 2022.

Digital edition 

Asmodee and Flaming Fowl Studios released a digital edition of Gloomhaven for Microsoft Windows, initially on July 17, 2019. The game was released for macOS on November 25, 2021. It was offered as an early access model, featuring a subset of the characters, and a single-player Adventure mode that uses procedural generation like a roguelike to create encounters. As of 2021, Asmodee and Flaming Fowl have added support for all 17 characters and the full set of 95 missions from the core board game, along with support for multiplayer.

References

Board games introduced in 2017
Cooperative board games
Kickstarter-funded tabletop games
Legacy games
Origins Award winners
Dungeon crawler board games
Fantasy board games
Board games with a modular board

External links
 Gloomhaven - Campaign Overview and Gloomhaven - Gaming Rules! - How to Play on YouTube
 Gloomhaven RuleBook